Minle is a station on Line 5 of the Chengdu Metro in China. It was opened on 27 December 2019.

References

Railway stations in Sichuan
Railway stations in China opened in 2019
Chengdu Metro stations